Senrab F.C. is a Sunday League football club, based at Wanstead Flats in the Forest Gate district of London, England.  It is noted for the high number of professional players who played for the club in their youth.

History
The club takes its name from Senrab Street in Stepney; the club's players trained at Marion Richardson School on Senrab Street (which is close to Barnes Street, and is 'Barnes' spelt backwards).

The club was founded in 1961 by then 15-year-old Jimmy Tindall (later a youth development officer for West Ham United), playing eight-a-side at first before progressing to 11-a-side within two years. Tindall's son, Jason was a 1990s product of Senrab, playing in midfield with Lee Bowyer before later moving to AFC Bournemouth. The club had three 11-a-side teams to begin with, all playing in the Regent's Park League. Tindall's recruitment policy was to pick up only the best young players, stipulating that to play for Senrab, a player must have previously played for his district or county. In the early 1970s, so many Senrab players signed for Chelsea that former player Ray Lewington nicknamed Senrab "Chelsea Juniors".

In 2014 Senrab were shortlisted for the Daily Mirror Pride of Sport Awards in the Local Team of the Year Category.

Operation
Senrab operates 15 teams for age groups ranging from 5 to 17 years old. The club has produced a great number of players who have gone on to have successful professional careers, including Sol Campbell, Jermain Defoe, Ledley King and John Terry.

A number of professional coaches have also started out at Senrab, most notably Dario Gradi, who, until June 2007, was the longest-serving football manager in the Football League. In April 2011, former Senrab player John Terry donated an undisclosed sum to the club to keep it running.

Former players
The following players and coaches have all gone on to play for or coach a professional football club after leaving Senrab FC.

Players

 Ade Akinbiyi
 Adebayo Akinfenwa
 Cliff Akurang
 Lee Bowyer
 Sol Campbell
 Scott Canham
 Gary Chivers
 Alan Curbishley
 Jermain Defoe
 Ugo Ehiogu
 Simon Ford
 Jonathan Fortune
 Leo Fortune-West
 Fitz Hall
 Vince Hilaire
 Terry Hurlock
 Kemal Izzet
 Muzzy Izzet
 Jodi Jones
 David Kerslake
 Ledley King
 Leon Knight
 Paul Konchesky
 Ezri Konsa
 Tommy Langley
 Ray Lewington
 Teddy Maybank
 Kevin Nicholls
 Darren Purse
 Jlloyd Samuel
 Terry Skiverton
 John Sparrow
 John Terry
 Jason Tindall
 Sanchez Watt
 Ray Wilkins
 Bobby Zamora

Coaches
Tony Carr
Alan Curbishley
Dario Gradi
Ray Wilkins
Ray Lewington
Lee Bowyer
Sol Campbell

References

Sources

Youth football clubs in England
Football clubs in London
Association football clubs established in 1961
1961 establishments in England
Football clubs in England